Maria Martin was a painter.

Maria Martin may also refer to:
 María Martín (actress), Spanish actress
 María Martín (gymnast), Spanish gymnast
 María Martín (politician), Spanish politician
 Marialejandra Martín, Venezuelan actress
 Maria Teresa Martín, Spanish volleyball player

See also
Maria Marten (disambiguation)
Maria Martins (disambiguation)